Jane Rutter (born 2 November 1958) is an Australian flautist. Her repertoire encompasses classical, jazz, and pop music.

Career
Rutter specializes in the French Flute School.

She has lectured at the Sydney Conservatorium of Music and formed the chamber group POSH. Rutter has performed worldwide. She has released over twenty solo albums.

Personal life
Rutter lives in Sydney with her family. Outside music, she supports green causes. In 2005 she took her stepmother to court over her father's estate.

Discography

Awards and nominations
In 2016, Rutter was awarded the Ordre des Arts et des Lettres.

ARIA Music Awards
The ARIA Music Awards is an annual awards ceremony that recognises excellence, innovation, and achievement across all genres of Australian music. They commenced in 1987.

! 
|-
| 1990
| Nocturnes & Preludes for Flutes
| Best Classical Album
| 
| 
|-
| 2004
| Brazil (with Slava Grigoryan)
| ARIA Award for Best World Music Album
| 
| 
|-
| 2012
| An Australian in Paris
| Best Original Soundtrack, Cast or Show Album
| 
| 
|-
| 2014
| Flute Spirit: Dreams and Improvisations
| Best World Music Album
| 
| 
|-

References

External links
 Official Web Site

Australian classical flautists
Australian pop musicians
Australian television personalities
Women television personalities
1958 births
Living people
Women flautists